The 2021–22 Plunket Shield was the 93rd season of the Plunket Shield, the domestic first-class cricket competition that was played in New Zealand. The tournament took place from October 2021 to April 2022. In July 2021, New Zealand Cricket named all the squads for the domestic teams ahead of the 2021–22 season. Canterbury were the defending champions.

In September 2021, New Zealand Cricket announced the schedule for the tournament. However, due to the impact of the COVID-19 pandemic in New Zealand, two of the opening round fixtures were postponed, and were rescheduled for a later date. Auckland won the tournament during the penultimate round of matches, after the match between Northern Districts and Central Districts ended in a draw due to positive COVID-19 cases in the Northern Districts' team. As a result of the COVID-19 cases, Northern Districts had 19 players unavailable for their final match of the season, with seven players making their first-class debut. It was the highest number of debutants in the same match for Northern Districts since their inaugural first-class fixture in 1956.

Points table

 Champions.
  
Teams were ranked by average points per completed match, including abandoned matches, which earned four points, but the regulations excluded the Covid-affected draw between Northern Districts and Central Districts from the calculations.

Fixtures

2021

2022

References

External links
 Series home at ESPN Cricinfo

Plunket Shield
2021–22 New Zealand cricket season
Plunket Shield